Dubai Sports City or DSC is a multi-venue sports complex in Dubai, United Arab Emirates, developed  by Dubai.  It provides a mix of residential, retail, leisure and recreational facilities. It is built around five major sports venues and features a number of sports academies. Located on Mohammad Bin Zayed Road the residential aspect of the project consists of mid-rise apartment buildings, townhouses and villas. Sports City contains three distinct residential districts: Canal Residence, Victory Heights and Gallery Villas.

Venues 

Dubai Sports City contains the following sporting complexes:
 Dubai International Stadium, a 25,000 seat cricket stadium.
 Spanish Soccer Schools. The head coach of the Spanish Soccer Schools is Inaki Beni, a UEFA Pro Coach who was formerly head coach of Real Madrid's U9, U11, U12 and U13 teams.
 ICC Academy, Facilities include two full-sized (ICC Academy Ground & ICC Academy Ground No 2), one-day international floodlit ovals, alongside the ICC Academy's building and pitches, which offer indoor and outdoor training facilities. These include technology tools for bowlers and batsmen, practice pitches of different surfaces, and indoor nets. The ICC Academy is the only training complex anywhere in the world to offer South Asian, English and Australian practice turf.
 Rugby Park, a 5,000 seat rugby stadium. The newest sports initiative of Dubai Sports City, the Rugby Park provides facilities for players, coaches, referees, at all levels of the game. The Rugby Park in future will also boast a gymnasium, sports science and rehabilitation facilities as well as a sports medical clinic.
 The Els Club Golf Course is golf park. It is a world's first and is also the first golf course designed by Ernie Els in the Middle East.
 The DSC Indoor Arena is a multi-use indoor arena that was being built until construction stopped because of the late-2000s recession.  Its planned use is mainly for basketball, tennis, ice hockey, and other indoor sports, as well as music concerts.  It was due to open in 2009 with a seating capacity of 10,000 spectators.

Events hosted 

 Hosted DUBAI Open Asian Tour's final event of 2014.
 Co-Hosted the inaugural and the second season of the Pakistan Super League, with sold out stadiums.
 Hosted IPL 7 (cricket), UAE-Leg in 2014.
 Hosted 2 ODI matches between Pakistan and Australia from 22 to 24 April 2009.
 Hosted 2 Twenty20 matches between Pakistan and New Zealand from 12 to 13 November 2009.
 Hosted 2 Indian musical concerts on 1 and 2 November 2009.
 Hosted 2 Twenty20 matches between Pakistan and England from 13 to 14 February 2010.
 The Els Club, located in Dubai sports city hosted Callaways Odyssey.
 Dubai Sports city hosted World Twenty20 qualifier matches in February 2010.
 Hosted 3 ODI matches between Pakistan and South Africa from 2 to 8 November 2010.
 Hosted a Test match between Pakistan and South Africa on 12 November 2010.
 In 2014, The 2014 Indian Premier League tournament was held in the stadium along with Sheikh Zayed Cricket Stadium and Sharjah Cricket Association Stadium.
 2018 Asia Cup was hosted at Dubai International Cricket Stadium along with Sheikh Zayed Cricket Stadium in Abu Dhabi.

Academies
 ICC Academy is a cricket academy which helps players, coaches, umpires, curators, and administrators focus on progress, training, and achievement.
 Spanish Soccer Schools is run by Spanish soccer star Míchel Salgado.
 Rugby Academy focuses on the development of talent throughout all age groups and standards up to and including elite club and international level. 
 Swimming Academy is the first swimming facility in the UAE to have high performance coaching and training resources offered to the sport.
 Butch Harmon School of Golf is run by Butch Harmon who is widely regarded as one of the best golf coaches in the world.

Residential towers

 Elite Towers from 1 to 10
 Olympic Park Towers OP from 1 to 4

References

External links 

 

 
Golf clubs and courses in the United Arab Emirates
Buildings and structures in Dubai
Dubailand